Lord Charles Arthur Francis Cavendish (5 August 1905 – 23 March 1944) was the second son of Victor Cavendish, 9th Duke of Devonshire and his wife, Lady Evelyn Petty-FitzMaurice.

Biography
Cavendish  was educated at St Cyprian's School, Eastbourne, Eton, and at Trinity College, Cambridge. He joined the Royal Tank Regiment where he became a Lieutenant.

Marriage
Cavendish was first introduced to dancer and actress Adele Astaire in London in 1927, on the closing night of her show Funny Face. He courted her while he worked for the bank J.P. Morgan & Co. in New York City. Adele proposed to Lord Charles at the 21 Club in Manhattan. They were married in 1932, at his family seat of Chatsworth House in Derbyshire.  Their children – a daughter born in 1933 and twin sons born in 1935 – lived only a few hours. The couple lived at Lismore Castle in County Waterford, Ireland, which had been given to them as a wedding present by Lord Charles's father, the 9th Duke of Devonshire.

Death
Cavendish died at Lismore Castle, aged 38, of long-term acute alcoholism and was buried at Lismore Cathedral. A clause in Lord Charles's will stipulated that Lismore Castle was to go to his nephew, Lord Andrew Cavendish (later the 11th Duke of Devonshire), if Adele remarried, which she did in 1947.

Ancestry

References

External links
 The Peerage
 Time Magazine 3 April 1944

1905 births
1944 deaths
Military personnel from Derbyshire
Alumni of Trinity College, Cambridge
Charles Arthur Francis Cavendish
Younger sons of dukes
Deaths from cirrhosis
English bankers
English expatriates in Ireland
English expatriates in the United States
People educated at Eton College
People educated at St Cyprian's School
People from Derbyshire
Derbyshire Yeomanry officers
Alcohol-related deaths in Ireland
20th-century English businesspeople
20th-century British Army personnel
Royal Tank Regiment officers